The Lioré et Olivier 300 (abbreviated to LeO 300) was a 1930s French prototype night bomber. Only one was built when the programme was abandoned.

Design and development
The LeO 300 was designed to meet a French requirement for a BN.5 category night bomber. It was a high-wing cantilever monoplane with a crew of five. The prototype first flew in September 1933, powered by four  Renault 12Jb engines mounted in tandem pairs on the wings. The LeO 300 was superseded by the LeO 301 with more powerful engines but with the withdrawal of the requirement it was abandoned in final assembly and work on the programme was stopped.

Variants
LeO 300
Prototype four-engine night bomber, one built.
Leo 301
Improved variant with more powerful engines, not completed.

Specifications

References
Notes

Bibliography

 

1930s French bomber aircraft
300
High-wing aircraft
Four-engined push-pull aircraft
Aircraft first flown in 1933